The Shaler Mountains are a mountain range that cross the Northwest Territories-Nunavut border on north-central Victoria Island, Canada. Although located partly in Nunavut the majority of the range lies in the Northwest Territories.

References

Mountain ranges of the Northwest Territories
Mountain ranges of Kitikmeot Region